Phys.org is an online science, research and technology news aggregator offering briefs from press releases and reports from news agencies (a form of journalism sometimes pejoratively called churnalism). The website also produces its own science journalism. Phys.org is one of the most updated science websites, with an average of 98 posts per day. It is part of the Science X network of websites, headquartered on the Isle of Man, United Kingdom. In April 2011, Phys.org launched the Medical Xpress site dedicated to content on medicine and health.

See also 
 EurekAlert!
 Science Daily

References

External links
 

British news websites
Technology websites
British technology news websites
News aggregators
British science websites
Internet properties established in 2004